The Sephardic Jews that were exiled from Spain and the Mediterranean area in 1492 and 1497, coupled with other migrations dating from the 1700s and during World War II contributed to Dominican ancestry.

The number of known Jews (or those with genetic proof of Jewish ancestry and/or who practiced Jewish customs/religion throughout generations) are close to 3,000; the exact number of Dominicans with Jewish lineages aren't known, however, because of intermarriage between the Jews and Dominicans over a period of more than five centuries.

History 
The first Jews known to have reached the island of Hispaniola were Sephardi Jews who came from the Iberian Peninsula during the colonization era in the 1490s.

When the island was divided by the French and Spanish Empires in the 17th century, most Jews settled on the Spanish side which would later become the Dominican Republic. Eventually, Sephardim from other countries also arrived. In the 19th century Jews from Curaçao settled in Hispaniola, although they did not form a strong community. Most of them hid their Jewish identities or were unaffiliated with Jewish tradition by that time. Among their descendants were Dominican President Francisco Henríquez y Carvajal and his issue Pedro Henríquez Ureña, Max Henríquez Ureña, and Camila Henríquez Ureña. The oldest Jewish grave is dated to 1826.

The Dominican Republic was the only sovereign country willing to accept mass Jewish immigration immediately prior and during World War II, the only alternative being the Shanghai International Settlement. At the Évian Conference, it offered to accept up to 100,000 Jewish refugees. It is estimated that 5,000 visas were actually issued, and the vast majority of the recipients did not reach the country because of how hard it was to get out of occupied Europe. The DORSA (Dominican Republic Settlement Association) was formed with the assistance of the Joint Distribution Committee, and helped settle Jews in Sosúa, on the northern coast. About 700 European Jews of Ashkenazi Jewish descent reached the settlement where each family received  of land, 10 cows (plus 2 additional cows per child), a mule and a horse, and a US$10,000 loan (about  dollars at  prices) at 1% interest. Other refugees settled in the capital, Santo Domingo. In 1943 the number of known Jews in the Dominican Republic peaked at 1000.

Sosúa's Jewish community experienced a deep decline in the 1980s due to emigration during the touristic boom of Sosúa when most Jews sold their land to developers.

Community 

The current population of known Jews in the Dominican Republic is close to 3,000, with the majority living in the capital, Santo Domingo, and others residing in Sosúa. Since Jews mixed with those already living in the Dominican Republic, the exact number of Dominicans with Jewish ancestry isn't known. In spite of the Jews intermarriage with the Dominican people already living there, some spouses have formalized their Judaism through conversions and participate in Jewish communal life while other Sephardic Jews converted to Catholicism, still maintaining their Sephardic culture. Some Dominican Jews have also made aliyah to Israel. There are three synagogues and one Sephardic Jewish Educational Center. One is the Centro Israelita de República Dominicana in Santo Domingo, another is a Chabad outreach center also in Santo Domingo, and another is in the country's first established community in Sosúa. Beth Midrash Eleazar , the Sephardic Educational Center, caters to those Jews who are descendants of the Sephardic Jews that migrated to Hispaniola in colonial times and later. In addition, they also provide kosher meat in the Beth Yoseph style, and supervise a small-scale kosher bakery. An "afterschool" at the Centro Israelita is active on a weekly basis and a chapter of the International Council of Jewish Women is also active. The Chabad outreach center  focuses on assisting the local Jewish population reconnect with their Jewish roots and (because Chabad is of the Chassidic Jewish tradition) it is a source for traditional Judaism in the Dominican Republic. In Sosua, there is a small Jewish Museum next to the synagogue. On the High Holidays, the Sosúa community hires a cantor from abroad who comes to lead services.

Research 
A great deal of research on the subject of Dominican Jewry was done by Rabbi Henry Zvi Ucko who had been a writer and teacher in Germany until political conditions and growing anti-Semitism forced him to emigrate. His travels eventually took him to the Dominican Republic, where he organized a congregation in Santo Domingo (Ciudad Trujillo) and began researching the history of Jews in the country. His research covered much of the history of the Sephardic Jews there and documented the assimilation that the population went through (and was going through) during his time. Included in his research is correspondence with Haim Horacio López Penha, a Dominican Jewish writer, who encouraged Ucko to write a history of the Jews in the Dominican Republic. More recently, the publication of the book "Once Jews" has made easily available information on many early Jewish settlers in the Dominican Republic. Scholars such as the historian of the town of Baní, Manuel Valera, as well as Dr. Yehonatan Demota, continue the study of Dominican Sephardic and converso ancestry, and the question of the Dominican anusim.

References

External links 

 History of Sosua, Dominican Republic
 More about the Sosua Community
 Tropical Zion: General Trujillo, FDR, and the Jews of Sosúa by Allen Wells
 Sosua Virtual Museum

Jews
Dominican Republic
Dominican Republic
Ethnic groups in the Dominican Republic
Dominican Republic
History of the Jews in the Caribbean